George Forty  (10 September 1927 – 19 May 2016) was a British Army officer who was chief of staff of the Royal Armoured Corps gunnery school and later director of the Tank Museum, and also author of many books on warfare.

Education and military career
Forty was born in London and educated at Ashville College and at Queen's College, Oxford University.

He joined the British Army in 1945, and was part of the first post-war class commissioned from the Royal Military Academy Sandhurst in 1948. He served in the British Army of the Rhine in the 1st Royal Tank Regiment, in Korea, where he was wounded in the Third Battle of the Hook in May 1953, and in Aden, the Persian Gulf and Borneo in command of an armoured reconnaissance squadron. After attending the Staff College in 1959, he held appointments at the Army Air Corps Centre and the Royal Armoured Corps Tactical, Signals and Gunnery Schools before retiring in 1971.

Writer and museum director
Forty published more than 70 books with a focus on armoured warfare and also on wartime in Dorset. From 1981 until his retirement in 1993 he served as the curator (director) of the Tank Museum. He modernised and greatly expanded it, becoming known as the "father of the Tank Museum". Forty's wife, Anne, worked with him at the Tank Museum. They had four sons, one of whom works at the Royal Signals Museum.

Honours
Forty was elected a Fellow of the Museums Association and in 1994 was appointed an OBE.

Works

Hitler's Atlantic Wall
 The Japanese Army Handbook 1939-1945 (1999)
Companion to the British Army 1939-45
US Marine Corps Handbook 1941-1945
Patton's Third Army at War
Desert Rats at War
World Encyclopedia of Tanks and Armoured Vehicles
Tiger Tank Battalions in World War II
Battle of Crete
The Armies of Rommel
Road to Berlin
The Soldier's Story: WWII German Infantryman
The Reich's Last Gamble: The Ardennes Offensive, December 1944

References 

1927 births
2016 deaths
Royal Tank Regiment officers
British military writers
Officers of the Order of the British Empire
People educated at Ashville College
Alumni of The Queen's College, Oxford
Fellows of the Museums Association
Graduates of the Royal Military Academy Sandhurst
British Army personnel of the Korean War
Royal Armoured Corps officers
Military personnel from London
Graduates of the Staff College, Camberley